The Air Tractor AT-1002 is a single-seat agricultural and firefighting aircraft made by American aircraft manufacturer Air Tractor. The aircraft is the company's largest, with a takeoff and landing weight of 20,000 pounds and useful load of 10,800 pounds. The aircraft can carry over 1,060 gallons of fire retardant or 335 gallons of agricultural spray.

The aircraft is an advanced version of the Air Tractor AT-802 and is designed to be able to carry a higher payload than its predecessors. Its main role is to replace aging or retired aircraft.

The aircraft first flew in 2009. Deliveries of the type began in 2010. In 2013, it served as a testbed for the Electronics International MVP-50T Engine Analyzer.

In 2022, it was revealed that the 1002 model was undergoing a redesign, and initial prototypes were released.

References

AT-1002
1990s United States special-purpose aircraft
1990s United States agricultural aircraft
Low-wing aircraft
Aerial firefighting aircraft
Floatplanes
Single-engined tractor aircraft
Single-engined turboprop aircraft